With Bare Hands is Alain Robert's autobiography, published in English in 2008. Thanks to a career of high-risk urban ascents, the French climber has gained the nicknames The French Spiderman and The Human Spider. The title With Bare Hands refers to his practice of climbing without the use of any safety equipment. The book follows Robert's achievements, from his childhood climbing cliffs in the gorges of southwestern France, to travelling the world looking for new skyscrapers to climb. The book offers insights into the mentality and motives of the world's most famous urban climber. It was first published by Blacksmith Books in Hong Kong and was edited and adapted by John Chan. The book was also published by Maverick House Publishers in the English language across Europe and in Australia and New Zealand.

Contents

 Prologue
Rock climber Alain Robert is asked by a film director to climb a tower in Chicago. It has never before been done. Chaos reigns as a reluctant Alain risks life and limb to scale his first building.

 Chapter 1: A Newly Discovered Mountain Range
Suddenly struck by the possibility of climbing buildings, Alain climbs skyscrapers in Paris and New York – experiencing arrest, media exposure and courtroom drama.

 Chapter 2: Le Tour de Paris
Alain is in demand by the media and teams up with a major magazine to scale famous landmarks in Paris in a series of bizarre escapades.

 Chapter 3: The Hatchling
Emerging from a coma after a fall from a cliff, Alain looks back over his life – his colourful childhood, his wild adolescence and two terrible falls which left him partially disabled.

 Chapter 4: European Trilogy
Alain gains fame in France and is set an assignment by a magazine editor. He has 12 days to travel across Europe and make three daring climbs.

 Chapter 5: Jailhouse Rock
Alain completes a perilous climb of the Golden Gate Bridge. He compares his experience in a tough US jail with prisons around the world, most notably his abuse in a dungeon in Asia.

 Chapter 6: Fantastico!
Alain is invited to Brazil where he is greeted as a superstar. His new fame does not go to his head as he befriends three impoverished children and visits them in their favela.

 Chapter 7: Liberty Bell
In Philadelphia by accident, Alain grows obsessed with climbing a seemingly impossible tower. After exhaustive attempts he cracks it but ends up in court – this time facing two years in jail.

 Chapter 8: Alain and the King
After failing to climb the world’s tallest building Alain finds himself in a nightmarish Malaysian jail. A minister intervenes and he is suddenly thrown into the high life, enjoying dinner with the King of Malaysia.

 Chapter 9: Spider-Man
Alain risks a caning in Singapore, performs an outrageous rock climb and makes his first ascents in Venezuela and London dressed as Spider-Man.

 Chapter 10: Fears and the Sears
The toughest assignments Alain has ever taken on – a deadly rock climb and the sheer glass walls of the Sears Tower almost kill him and force him to confront his deepest fears.

 Chapter 11: Asia Rising
Alain scales Taipei 101, the world’s tallest tower – and does it injured after falling off a traffic light. He dodges security to climb the Jin Mao Tower, China’s tallest building and is beaten up by police in Tokyo.

 Chapter 12: The Sands of Time
Alain rubs shoulders with the elite of the Arab world, and then climbs before an audience of 100,000. He looks to the future, considers his ageing body, and concedes that climbing may well kill him.

References
Human Spider Alain Robert comes to London — Daily Telegraph

External links
With Bare Hands: The Story of the Human Spider — publisher's site (Maverick House Publishers)
Alain Robert — official website of Alain Robert

2008 non-fiction books
Sports autobiographies
Mountaineering books